Shurab Rural District is a rural district (dehestan) in Veysian District, Dowreh County, Lorestan Province, Iran. At the 2006 census, its population was 5,081, in 1,160 families.  The rural district has 38 villages.

References 

Rural Districts of Lorestan Province
Dowreh County